John Bee Holmes was the seventh intendant (mayor) of Charleston, South Carolina, serving one term between 1794 and 1795.

Holmes born in 1760 to Isaac Holmes and Rebecca Bee. During the Revolutionary War, he was the aide-de-camp to General John Barnwell. He married Elizabeth Edwards in 1783 and was admitted to practice law the same year. He owned Washington Plantation on the Cooper River in St. John's Parish (Berkeley County).

Holmes was elected intendant in September 1794. He resigned in September 1795 and was followed in office by his brother-in-law, John Edwards. He also held state office, representing the Charleston area in the General Assembly of South Carolina from 1791 to 1797. He served in the South Carolina Senate from 1799 to 1801.

He died on September 5, 1827, and is buried at the Circular Congregational churchyard in Charleston.

References

Mayors of Charleston, South Carolina
1760 births
1827 deaths
Members of the South Carolina House of Representatives
South Carolina state senators
People of South Carolina in the American Revolution